Xiangcheng County is a county in the central part of Henan province, China. It is located in the southwest of the prefecture-level city of Xuchang, and is its southernmost county-level division.

Administrative divisions
As 2012, this county is divided to 6 towns , 1 ethic town and 9 townships.
Towns

Ethnic towns
Yingqiao Hui Town

Townships

Climate

References

County-level divisions of Henan
Xuchang